Pietro da Rimini lived in the early part of the 14th century, and is the author of a Crucifixion at Urbania, near Urbino. Paintings in S. Maria Portofuori in Ravenna are attributed to him.

References

14th-century Italian painters
Italian male painters
Trecento painters
Gothic painters
Year of death unknown
Year of birth unknown